Gárdonyi Városi Sport Club is a professional football club based in Gárdony, Hungary, that competes in the Nemzeti Bajnokság III, the third tier of Hungarian football.

Honours

Domestic

Season results
As of 15 August 2021

References

External links
 Profile on Magyar Futball

Football clubs in Hungary
Association football clubs established in 1997
1997 establishments in Hungary